Convoy is a lost 1927 American silent World War I drama starring Lowell Sherman and Dorothy Mackaill and released through First National Pictures. The film is an early producing credit for the Halperin Brothers, Victor and Edward, later of White Zombie fame, and is the final screen appearance of Broadway stars Gail Kane and Vincent Serrano.

The Alfred Hitchcock film Notorious (1946) was based on the same story, originally published in The Saturday Evening Post.

Background
The Song of the Dragon, is a story by John Taintor Foote, which appeared as a two-part serial in The Saturday Evening Post in November 1921. Set during World War I in New York City, The film tells the tale of a theatrical producer approached by federal agents who want his assistance in recruiting an actress he once had a relationship with to seduce the leader of a gang of enemy saboteurs.

Cast
Lowell Sherman as Ernest Drake
Dorothy Mackaill as Sylvia Dodge
William Collier, Jr. as John Dodge
Lawrence Gray as Eugene Weyeth
Ian Keith as Smith
Gail Kane as Mrs. Weyeth
Vincent Serrano as Mr. Dodge
Donald Reed as Smith's Assistant
Eddie Gribbon as Eddie
Jack Ackroyd as Jack
Ione Holmes as Ione

References

External links

Still of Dorothy Mackaill and Lawrence Gray from the film

1927 films
1927 war films
1927 drama films
American black-and-white films
American silent feature films
American war drama films
Films based on American novels
Films directed by Lothar Mendes
First National Pictures films
Lost American films
1920s American films
Silent American drama films
Silent war drama films
1920s war drama films
1920s English-language films